Bəyazatlı (also, Bayazatly and Beyazatly) is a village in the Agstafa Rayon of Azerbaijan.

References 

Populated places in Aghstafa District